Laggan Dam is a dam located on the River Spean south west of Loch Laggan in the Scottish Highlands.

History
The structure was built as part of the Lochaber hydroelectric scheme by Balfour Beatty for the British Aluminium Company and construction was finished in 1934. The supervising engineers were the firm of C S Meik and William Halcrow, now known as the Halcrow Group.

The dam was designated a Category B listed building in 1985. It was upgraded to Category A listing in 2011, following a review as part of Hydroelectric Power Thematic Survey 2010.

Design

The whole crest of the dam, except for a section in the middle that houses equipment, is a spillway broken into 29 bays by piers that support a roadway across the dam. As well as the spillway, there are six pipes embedded into the centre of the dam, controlled automatically by system of air valves. The foundations are built on granite, and the dam was built in seven sections, with copper strip and hot poured asphalt water stops in the joints.

Water from the dam is conveyed to Loch Treig through  of tunnel. From there, the waters travel through a further  of tunnel  in diameter, before descending the hillside to a power house at Fort William through five steel pipes. The dam can be found next to the A86 road from Fort William. The catchment area of the dam was increased by an aqueduct which can be seen at the side of the road in Strath Mashie.

References

External links

 Magazine cover showing the dam under construction

Dams in Scotland
Dams completed in 1934
Energy infrastructure completed in 1934
Category A listed buildings in Highland (council area)
1934 establishments in Scotland